Nikos Englezou (born July 11, 1993) is a Cypriot professional footballer who plays for AEK Larnaca  . He is also a member of the youth national teams of Cyprus. His natural position is the left back position.

Club career

Early career
Englezou started his career in the youth teams of Apollon Limassol in 2008. The following year he went on trial to English side Nottingham Forest – the trial itself was successful but Englezou decided not to move to England; he joined Greek club AEK Athens and signed a semi-professional contract for the club.

AEK Athens
He signed his first professional contract with AEK in July 2011 and followed AEK's first team during the summer's pre-season training, with his manager Manolo Jiménez praising Englezou's crossing abilities. However, he was demoted to the reserve team after pre-season is over and did not make his first team debut until a UEFA Europa League home match against Anderlecht on 1 December 2011. He made his Superleague debut four months later at an away game against Doxa Drama, and played for a second time at a play-off match against Atromitos on 10 May 2012.

Loan to Nea Salamis
In summer 2012, Englezou was called up by the Cypriot National Guard for military service, so he moved to Cypriot First Division side Nea Salamina for a season-long loan in order for him to be closer at home.

AEK Larnaca
After his loan was over he returned to AEK Athens were his contract was terminated. On July 1, 2013, Englezou signed for Cypriot First Division club AEK Larnaca.

International career
Englezou was a regular member to all Cyprus youth sides. On 28 March 2015 he was called up for the first time to the senior team by manager Pambos Christodoulou, for the match against Belgium.

References

External links
 
 UEFA Europa League profile at uefa.com
 Under-19 profile at uefa.com
 Profile at Onsports.gr 

1993 births
Living people
Cypriot footballers
Cypriot expatriate footballers
Cyprus international footballers
Cyprus under-21 international footballers
Cyprus youth international footballers
Super League Greece players
AEK Athens F.C. players
Nea Salamis Famagusta FC players
Doxa Katokopias FC players
Association football defenders
Association football midfielders
Expatriate footballers in Greece
Cypriot expatriate sportspeople in Greece
Sportspeople from Limassol